Lockland is a village in Hamilton County, Ohio, United States. The population was 3,514 at the 2020 United States Census. Lockland is located in southwest Ohio, north of Cincinnati. Its population has declined since the latter part of the 20th century.

History

The birth of the town, and its name, are related to the first set of lock gates on the Miami and Erie Canal traveling north from Cincinnati. The canal served as a major transportation route linking commerce from as far as New Orleans to New York City. Many people and industry were attracted to the western Ohio area by the idea of connecting Lake Erie to the Ohio River. Lockland provided an abundance of water power with its  difference in water levels, allowing for a water-powered gristmill. A large reservoir pond allowed boats to dock for repairs or layover. Even today a section of Lockland is still referred to as "Bud-Town" which was the bedding and entertainment area of the day. A proliferation of railways during the latter part of the nineteenth century across the area gradually reduced the waterway's usefulness, and the canal operation was officially halted in 1929. The canal sat still for a few years during the thirties. The Mill Creek Expressway reused some portions of the canal's right-of-way as well as the Wright-Lockland Highway. The National Interstate and Defense Highways Act of 1956 created today's interstate system, including Interstate 75 along the Mill Creek Expressway.

Lockland was home to the Stearns and Foster Mattress company, which was founded in Cincinnati in 1846 and moved to Lockland in 1880. The original factory and office building still stand in the downtown area of the village. By 2015 demolition was complete, including removal of the smokestack on 26 March.

Geography
Lockland is located at  (39.226409, -84.455217).

Demographics

2010 census
As of the 2010 United States Census, there were 3,449 people, 1,462 households, and 797 families in the village. The racial makeup of the village was 64.5% White, 29.9% African American, 0.2% Native American, 0.2% Asian, 0.1% Pacific Islander, 1.9% from other races, and 3.4% from two or more races. Hispanic or Latino of any race were 4.2% of the population.

There were 1,462 households, of which 29.6% had children under the age of 18 living with them, 28.5% were married couples living together, 18.2% had a female householder with no husband present, 7.8% had a male householder with no wife present, and 45.5% were non-families. 34.4% of all households were made up of individuals, and 9% had someone living alone who was 65 years of age or older. The average household size was 2.36 and the average family size was 3.04.

The median age in the village was 35.7 years. 23.8% of residents were under the age of 18; 10.5% were between the ages of 18 and 24; 28.3% were from 25 to 44; 27% were from 45 to 64; and 10.4% were 65 years of age or older. The gender makeup of the village was 51.3% male and 48.7% female.

2000 census
As of the 2000 census, there were 3,707 people, 1,617 households, and 902 families in the village. The population density was 3,030.8 people per square mile (1,173.2/km2). There were 1,826 housing units at an average density of 1,492.9 per square mile (577.9/km2).  The racial makeup of the village was 70.43% White, 26.30% African American, 0.27% Native American, 0.46% Asian, 0.94% from other races, and 1.59% from two or more races.  Hispanic or Latino of any race were 1.54% of the population.

There were 1,617 households, out of which 27.2% had children under the age of 18 living with them, 34.8% were married couples living together, 16.1% had a female householder with no husband present, and 44.2% were non-families.  36.9% of all households were made up of individuals, and 11.8% had someone living alone who was 65 years of age or older.  The average household size was 2.29 and the average family size was 2.99.

The village population contained 24.0% under the age of 18, 9.4% from 18 to 24, 33.2% from 25 to 44, 21.5% from 45 to 64, and 11.9% who were 65 years of age or older. The median age was 36 years. For every 100 females there were 101.6 males. For every 100 females age 18 and over, there were 101.0 males.

The median income for a household in the village was $28,292, and the median income for a family was $33,984. Males had a median income of $30,638 versus $22,755 for females. The per capita income for the village was $15,661. About 14.2% of families and 17.1% of the population were below the poverty line, including 26.5% of those under age 18 and 9.8% of those age 65 or over.

Notable people

 Jacob Ammen (1806–1894) Union Army general and civil engineer retired and died here.
 Thomas Berger (1924–2014), novelist
 William Goines (b. 1936), first African-American Navy SEAL
 Ramona (1909–1972), singer and cabaret performer

References

External links

 Village website

Villages in Hamilton County, Ohio
Villages in Ohio